Fishtail Point is the southernmost point of Shults Peninsula, at the east side of the mouth of Skelton Glacier in Antarctica. It was surveyed and given this descriptive name in 1957 by the New Zealand party of the Commonwealth Trans-Antarctic Expedition (1956–58).

References 

Headlands of the Ross Dependency
Hillary Coast